Tomohisa Kuramitsu, better known by his stage name Baiyon, is a Japanese multimedia artist from Kyoto. Baiyon uses graphical design and music in combination.

In 1998, he began painting and making music, and later founded the Brain Escape Sandwich Recordings label. As a visual artist, Kuramitsu went by the name Wet Side and applied worked with posters, clothing, and copyright-free graphics.

History
2004 - Involved in the production of documentary "moog", charged with the opening, and sections of the closing, theme
2005 - Live painting at Aichi Expo
2006 - Released first Album Like a school on lunch time' (also available on 7-inch EP)
2007 - Took part in Stop Rokkasho Project
2008 - Released "Goshoguruma EP" through WC Recordings
2008 - Released "S Soup EP" through Irish label D1 Recordings.
2011 - helped with Media Molecule to make a soundtrack for LittleBigPlanet 2
Baiyon created the graphics and composed the background music for the PlayStation Network game PixelJunk Eden.The Creation of Eden, Interview with Baiyon by CoreGamers  PixelJunk Eden has since been released for PC through Valve's digital distribution platform, Steam. The game's soundtrack, created by Baiyon, is available alone or bundled with the game. The soundtrack includes his music from the original game and the "Encore" expansion.

He was the musical director for the PlayStation Network game PixelJunk 4am,'' released in May 2012.

References

External links

 Baiyon's English homepage
 Brain Escape Sandwich Recordings (Japanese)
 Wet Side, graphic design
 CoreGamers Interview about Baiyon's work in PixelJunk Eden

Japanese multimedia artists
Year of birth missing (living people)
Living people
Japanese people
Artists from Kyoto